Vilma Charlton (born 7 December 1946) is a Jamaican sprinter. She competed in the women's 100 metres at the 1968 Summer Olympics.

References

1946 births
Living people
Athletes (track and field) at the 1964 Summer Olympics
Athletes (track and field) at the 1968 Summer Olympics
Athletes (track and field) at the 1972 Summer Olympics
Jamaican female sprinters
Olympic athletes of Jamaica
Athletes (track and field) at the 1966 British Empire and Commonwealth Games
Commonwealth Games bronze medallists for Jamaica
Commonwealth Games medallists in athletics
Athletes (track and field) at the 1967 Pan American Games
Pan American Games bronze medalists for Jamaica
Pan American Games medalists in athletics (track and field)
Place of birth missing (living people)
Medalists at the 1967 Pan American Games
Central American and Caribbean Games medalists in athletics
Olympic female sprinters
20th-century Jamaican women
21st-century Jamaican women
Medallists at the 1966 British Empire and Commonwealth Games